Nützen is a municipality in the district of Segeberg, in Schleswig-Holstein, Germany. Two areas, Kampen and Springhirsch, are within its jurisdiction.

Geography and transport
Nützen lies about 7 km south of Bad Bramstedt, between the Bundesstraße 4 from Hamburg to Neumünster and the Bundesautobahn 7, which also goes from Hamburg to Neumünster. 
Kampen was originally a farm and Springhirsch lies directly on the Bundesstraße 4.

References

Municipalities in Schleswig-Holstein
Segeberg